Gormania Presbyterian Church, now known as Gormania United Methodist Church, is a historic Presbyterian church on Mabis Avenue, 0.1 miles south of US 50 in Gormania, Grant County, West Virginia. It was built in 1888, and is a single-story ornate wooden structure in a late form of the Gothic Revival style.  It features a corner entrance bell tower and tall spire.  A rear addition including three Sunday school rooms was built in 1925.  It was occupied by a Presbyterian congregation until the 1980s.  In 1994, the Gormania United Methodist Church purchased the building.

It was listed on the National Register of Historic Places in 2005.

References

Churches on the National Register of Historic Places in West Virginia
United Methodist churches in West Virginia
Presbyterian churches in West Virginia
Carpenter Gothic church buildings in West Virginia
Churches completed in 1888
19th-century Presbyterian church buildings in the United States
Buildings and structures in Grant County, West Virginia
National Register of Historic Places in Grant County, West Virginia
1888 establishments in West Virginia